Def Jam Rapstar is a music video game based on rapping, developed by 4mm Games and Terminal Reality. It was released on October 5, 2010 in North America and on November 26, 2010 in Europe.

Gameplay

Def Jam Rapstar is a rap-themed karaoke game. The game uses radio versions of all its tracks to secure a "Teen" rating by the ESRB. Players are not penalized for cursing, but it is not a required part of the game. There are two modes, Career and Party modes. The Career mode is in five stages. Each stage has eight tracks for the player to master, including a New Song Challenge which is unlocked as the player progresses through the stage. The Party mode allows players to simply pick an individual song and perform it.

Development
Executive Vice President Paul Coyne of 4mm Games said, "Internally, we used [Get On Da Mic] as the architectural model of how not to do Def Jam Rapstar."

Reception

The PlayStation 3 version received "generally favorable reviews", while the Xbox 360 and Wii versions received "mixed or average reviews" according to video game review aggregator Metacritic.

The Guardian gave the Xbox 360 version four stars out of five and called it "an absolute must. If you've found yourself mouthing the words to A Milli on the tube, there's a huge amount of fun to be had here. And while it doesn't have the universal appeal of its more mainstream counterparts, the potential of its online feature means it could well become a huge sleeper success."

IGN gave the Xbox 360 and PS3 versions of the game a 7.5 out of 10. They praised the scoring accuracy and the features, but criticized the censorship in the songs as the game went for a "Teen" rating.

See also
 Karaoke Revolution
 SingStar
 Battle Rap Stars

References

2010 video games
Def Jam video games
Kinect games
Konami games
Music video games
Karaoke video games
PlayStation 3 games
Video games developed in the United States
Wii games
Xbox 360 games
Multiplayer and single-player video games
Terminal Reality games